Oleg Olegovich Lanin (born 22 January 1996) is a Russian football player who plays for Yenisey Krasnoyarsk.

Club career
He made his professional debut in the Russian Professional Football League for FC Krasnodar-2 on 10 April 2014 in a game against FC Mashuk-KMV Pyatigorsk.

He made his debut for the main squad of FC Krasnodar on 30 October 2013 in a Russian Cup game against FC Dolgoprudny.

He made his Russian Premier League debut for PFC Krylia Sovetov Samara on 31 July 2018 in a game against PFC CSKA Moscow.

On 21 January 2019, he joined FC Khimki on loan until the end of the 2018–19 season, with Khimki holding a buyout option.

On 21 June 2019, he re-joined Yenisey Krasnoyarsk on loan for the 2019–20 season. On 30 December 2019, his contract with Krasnodar was terminated by mutual consent, and he signed a 1.5-year contract with Yenisey.

References

1996 births
People from Ust-Labinsky District
Sportspeople from Krasnodar Krai
Living people
Russian footballers
Russia youth international footballers
Russia under-21 international footballers
Association football midfielders
FC Krasnodar players
FC Krasnodar-2 players
FC Baltika Kaliningrad players
FC Yenisey Krasnoyarsk players
PFC Krylia Sovetov Samara players
FC Khimki players
Russian Premier League players
Russian First League players
Russian Second League players